Christoph Ullmann (born 19 May 1983) is a German former professional ice hockey player. He played the duration of his career in the Deutsche Eishockey Liga (DEL).

Playing career
On April 3, 2011, Ullmann left Kölner Haie and returned for another spell with Adler Mannheim of the Deutsche Eishockey Liga (DEL). He played a further 7 seasons with Mannheim, leaving at the conclusion of the 2017–18 season, having compiled a career low with 7 points in 41 games.

As a free agent, Ullman extended his career by agreeing to a one-year contract with his third DEL club, Augsburger Panther, on April 19, 2018. He later returned for a second season before ending his 20-year professional career following the early end to the 2019–20 season due to the COVID-19 pandemic.

International play
Ullmann has participated in eight ice Hockey World Championships as a member of the German National men's ice hockey team, including the 2004, 2007, 2008, 2009, 2010, 2011, 2012, and the 2013 IIHF World Championship.

Career statistics

Regular season and playoffs

International

References

External links

1983 births
Adler Mannheim players
Augsburger Panther players
German ice hockey forwards
Kölner Haie players
Living people
People from Altötting
Sportspeople from Upper Bavaria